Even Cowgirls Get the Blues is a 1993 American romantic comedy-drama film based on Tom Robbins' 1976 novel of the same name. The film was directed by Gus Van Sant (credited as Gus Van Sant Jr.) and starred an ensemble cast led by Uma Thurman, Lorraine Bracco, Angie Dickinson, Noriyuki "Pat" Morita, Keanu Reeves, John Hurt, and Rain Phoenix. Robbins himself was the narrator. The soundtrack was sung entirely by k.d. lang. The film was dedicated to the late River Phoenix.

Plot
Sissy Hankshaw is a woman born with a mutation (she would not call it a defect) giving her enormously large thumbs. Sissy makes the most of her thumbs by becoming a hitchhiker. Her travels eventually take her to New York City, where she becomes a model for a homosexual feminine hygiene products mogul, known as "The Countess". A few years later, he introduces her to his "beauty ranch", the Rubber Rose Ranch. The main plot revolves around the cowgirls who work at the ranch after they violently take over and drug the endangered whooping cranes that nest along the lake on their land, making the once migratory birds stay. The cowgirls end up in a showdown with government agencies because the cranes will not leave the ranch and the cowgirls refuse to allow the men on the ranch to take the cranes. Sissy and the ranch leader, Bonanza Jellybean, have a brief love affair. After a fatal shootout between the cowgirls and the various agencies, the cranes leave, and Sissy takes over running the ranch.

Cast

Production
Even Cowgirls Get the Blues was shot throughout Oregon: Portland, Terrebonne, Sisters, and Bend.

Though some viewers claim that River Phoenix is visible in a brief cameo near the end of the film, director Gus Van Sant, costar Udo Kier, and Phoenix's own assistant at the time, Sue Solgot, have all asserted that Phoenix was not in the film.  Van Sant further states, "River wasn't even in the desert when we shot.  That is Jim Baldwin in the beekeeper's hat."

The film was set to be released in the fall of 1993, but was delayed for post-production edits after Van Sant was dissatisfied with the cut screened at the 1993 Toronto International Film Festival. Among the changes Van Sant made were cuts to the New York-set scenes and scenes showing Sissy's relationship with Julian Gitche (the character played by Keanu Reeves), in favor of featuring more ranch scenes and focusing more attention on the relationship between Sissy and Bonanza Jellybean. A subplot about the Clock People, who are keepers of the keys to cosmic consciousness and whose presence in the story is signified by the image of the clock on the film’s poster, was also excised from the final film.

Reception
The film was a critical and commercial failure. The picture opened in wide release on May 20, 1994, and grossed a mere $1,708,873 against an estimated $8.5 million budget.
On Metacritic the film has a score of 28% based on reviews from 16 critics, indicating "generally unfavorable reviews".

Film historian and critic Leonard Maltin said "The novel was hopelessly dated, and there is not enough peyote in the entire American Southwest to render this movie comprehensible or endurable...K.D. Lang's [sic] score is the picture's sole worthy component." 
Nathan Rabin of The A.V. Club called it "forgettable" and "tedious", and "It was god-awful. Unwatchable, almost."

Richard F. Weingroff of Federal Highway Administration said "Forget it - skip this lousy movie and read the novel by Tom Robbins."

Year-end lists 
 First worst – Robert Denerstein, Rocky Mountain News
 First worst – Janet Maslin, The New York Times
 Second worst – Desson Howe, The Washington Post
 Eighth worst – Peter Travers, Rolling Stone
 Top 10 worst (not ranked) – Dan Webster, The Spokesman-Review
 Top 12 worst (not ranked) – David Elliott, The San Diego Union-Tribune
 Dishonorable mention – William Arnold, Seattle Post-Intelligencer

Accolades
 Golden Raspberry Award for Worst Actress - Uma Thurman (nominated - lost to Sharon Stone for Intersection and The Specialist)
 Golden Raspberry Award for Worst Supporting Actress - Sean Young (nominated - lost to Rosie O'Donnell for Car 54, Where Are You?, Exit to Eden, and The Flintstones)

Home media

The film was released on Region 1 DVD on November 2, 2004, containing its original aspect ratio of 1.85:1 and on NTSC LaserDisc by Image Entertainment in late 1994, also in its original aspect ratio.
It received a second DVD release in the United States from UCA on April 6, 2010, now in a new cropped 1.78:1 widescreen version.

In 2007, the film received its first DVD release in the UK from Universal Pictures Home Entertainment in a 1.33:1 full frame version.

Soundtrack

The soundtrack was released on November 2, 1993 by Sire Records. k.d. lang performed the music. The album was composed by lang and Ben Mink. The soundtrack went top 10 in Australia and top five in New Zealand (numbers 10 and four, respectively), and also peaked at number 82 on the Billboard 200 in the United States.

 "Just Keep Me Moving" (3:56)
 "Much Finer Place" (0:51)
 "Or Was I" (3:07)
 "Hush Sweet Lover" (4:05)
 "Myth" (4:08)
 "Apogee" (0:37)
 "Virtual Vortex" (0:44)
 "Lifted by Love" (3:02)
 "Overture" (2:03)
 "Kundalini Yoga Waltz" (1:07)
 "In Perfect Dreams" (3:07)
 "Curious Soul Astray" (3:40)
 "Ride of Bonanza Jellybean" (1:47)
 "Don't Be a Lemming Polka" (2:17)
 "Sweet Little Cherokee" (2:48)
 "Cowgirl Pride" (1:47)

Chart performance

Certifications

See also
 List of American films of 1994
 Cowgirl
 Tom Robbins

References

External links
 
 
 
 

1990s English-language films
1990s German-language films
1993 LGBT-related films
1993 films
1993 independent films
1990s romantic comedy-drama films
American LGBT-related films
American romantic comedy-drama films
Films directed by Gus Van Sant
Films with screenplays by Gus Van Sant
1990s feminist films
Films based on American novels
Films based on romance novels
Films shot in Bend, Oregon
Films shot in Portland, Oregon
Films about hitchhiking
Lesbian-related films
American road comedy-drama films
1990s road comedy-drama films
William S. Burroughs
LGBT-related romantic comedy-drama films
1990s American films